List of administrative division codes of the PRC in Division 4 or South Central China .

Henan (41)

Hubei (42)

Hunan (43)

Guangdong (44)

Guangxi (45)

Hainan (46)

China geography-related lists